The 1979 British Open Championships sponsored by Avis, was held at the Wembley Squash Centre in London from 31 March - 8 April 1979. Geoff Hunt won his sixth title defeating Qamar Zaman in a repeat of the 1978 final.

Seeds

Draw and results

First round*

Second round*

First round* and Second round* matches incomplete.

Third round to final

References

Men's British Open Squash Championships
Men's British Open Squash Championships
Men's British Open Squash Championships
Men's British Open Squash Championships
Men's British Open Squash Championship
Men's British Open Squash Championship
Squash competitions in London